The Hannes Alfvén Prize is a prize established by the European Physical Society (EPS) Plasma Physics Division in 2000. The Prize is awarded annually by the European Physical Society at the EPS Conference on Plasma Physics for outstanding work in the field of plasma physics: "for achievements which have shaped the plasma physics field or are expected to do so in future."

It is named after the Swedish physicist Hannes Alfvén.

List of winners

See also
 James Clerk Maxwell Prize for Plasma Physics
 List of physics awards
 List of prizes named after people

References

External links
Official page at EPS website (includes names of prize winners)
EPS PPD annual reports

Awards of the European Physical Society
Plasma physics
Awards established in 2000